Sainik School Satara is one of the 33 Sainik Schools of India. It is a purely residential school for boys and now even Girls can get admitted in this school. The medium of instruction is English along-with Marathi sometimes.  Established by Government of India on 23 June 1961 at Satara. It is affiliated to Central Board of Secondary Education and is a member of Indian Public Schools Conference (IPSC).It also has  Primary Sainik School Satara  attached to it.

Satara has the distinction of being the first of many such Sainik Schools in India. The school prepares boys and girls for entry into the National Defence Academy, Khadakwasla, Pune and other military academies as well as for other walks of life.

History
Sainik School, Satara was founded on 23 Jun 1961 during the tenure of Shri Yashwantrao Chavan, the Chief Minister of Maharashtra State. It was inaugurated by the Defence Minister of India, Shri V K Krishna Menon with the aim of preparing boys academically, mentally and physically for entry into the National Defence Academy and other Defence Academies, who hail from financially weaker sections of the society and thereby removing the regional imbalance for such entries in the Armed Forces.

Administration 
The administration of Sainik School is vested in an autonomous body known as Sainik Schools Society under Ministry of Defence, India. Sainik Schools Society is headed by the Board of Governors under the Chairmanship of Raksha Mantri (Union Minister of Defense). The Chief Ministers/Education Ministers of the states where the Sainik Schools are located, are members of the Board of Governors. There is a Local Board of Administration for each school with a senior defense service officer as its Chairman.

The Flag Officer Maharashtra  Area, Indian Navy, is Chairman of Local Board of Administration of the school.

Campus 
Sainik School Satara is located in the city of Satara on the Pune-Bangalore Highway.

Facilities
The school has well equipped class rooms, laboratories, Art Gallery, Play Ground, Auditorium, Infirmary, Library and Visitor's lounge.

Mess
The school has a central mess which caters food to all cadets in one sitting. Both vegetarian and non-vegetarian food is available. It is managed by a Mess manager.

Cadet Dormitories
The school is fully residential. All cadets are accommodated in Dormitories (known as Houses) under direct supervision of Housemasters who act as their guides and guardians. The housemasters are assisted in their job by Matron/Hostel Superintendents who take care of cadets' personal hygiene and comforts.

Admissions
Admissions are given in Class VI, Class IX and Class XI. Admission for classes VI and IX is carried out on the basis of an entrance exam usually held in January.

 Sale of Admission Form : During the month of October to December
 Last date of Submission of Admission form : First week of December
 Date of Entrance exam : First Sunday of January

N.C.C.
N.C.C. is an integral part of students' life in Sainik School Satara. The School has an Independent Company of Junior and Senior Division N.C.C. as integral part. N.C.C. unit of school comprises all the three wings of defence services i.e. the Army, Navy and Air Force.

Alumni
Sainik School Satara has produced numerous stalwarts in various fields like bureaucrats, doctors, Actors, engineers, journalists, entrepreneurs, business leaders along with numerous military leaders. The students of Sainik School Satara are also known as AJINKYANS. This is because of the famous fort of Ajinkyatara in the City of Satara. The school annual magazine published every year is also titled as AJINKYATARA.

NOTABLE ALUMNI:

Mukul S. Anand
Vice Admiral SV Bhokare
Sudhir Gadgil
Air Chief Marshal (Retd.) Pradeep Vasant Naik
Lt Gen (Retd.) Rajendra Ramrao Nimbhorkar
Rakesh Roshan
Rajat Ubhaykar
Lt Gen Pradeep Nair,DG Assam Rifles
Lt Gen Milind Bhurke
Lt Gen Jagdish B Chaudhari

References

External links 
 
 Sainik Schools Society

Sainik schools
Schools in Maharashtra
Education in Satara district
Educational institutions established in 1961
1961 establishments in Maharashtra
Satara (city)